uMhlathuze Local Municipality is an administrative area in the King Cetshwayo District Municipality of KwaZulu-Natal in South Africa. The municipality is named after the Mhlatuze River.

The municipality was enlarged at the time of the South African municipal election, 2016 when part of the disbanded Ntambanana Local Municipality was merged into it.

Main places
The 2001 census divided the municipality into the following main places:

Politics 

The municipal council consists of sixty-seven members elected by mixed-member proportional representation. Thirty-four councillors are elected by first-past-the-post voting in thirty-four wards, while the remaining thirty-three are chosen from party lists so that the total number of party representatives is proportional to the number of votes received.

In the 2021 South African municipal elections the African National Congress (ANC) lost its majority, winning a plurality of twenty-seven seats on the council. The following table shows the results of the election.

By-elections
The following by-elections were held to fill vacant ward seats in the period from the election in November 2021.

The by-election took place after the African National Congress (ANC) representative, facing community pressure, resigned. With the victory, the Inkatha Freedom Party solidified its coalition hold on council.

References

External links
 https://www.umhlathuze.gov.za/

Local municipalities of the King Cetshwayo District Municipality